Stanislav Nohýnek (born 2 August 1983) is a former Czech footballer.

Club career
In August 2011, he joined Slovak club Zemplín Michalovce on a one-year contract.

References

External links
 
 Guardian Football

Czech footballers
Czech expatriate footballers
1983 births
Living people
Sportspeople from Příbram
1. FK Příbram players
Czech First League players
MFK Zemplín Michalovce players
2. Liga (Slovakia) players
FC Sunkar players
Kazakhstan Premier League players
Expatriate footballers in Slovakia
Czech expatriate sportspeople in Slovakia
Expatriate footballers in Kazakhstan
Czech expatriate sportspeople in Kazakhstan
Expatriate footballers in Austria
Czech expatriate sportspeople in Austria
Association football defenders